Mzechabuk "Chabua" Amirejibi, (often written as "Amiredjibi", ; 18 November 1921 – 12 December 2013) was a Georgian novelist and Soviet-era dissident notable for his magnum opus, Data Tutashkhia, and a lengthy experience in Soviet prisons.

Early life and career 

He was born in Tbilisi, Georgian SSR, in 1921.  His family, once a princely house, was heavily repressed during Joseph Stalin's Great Purge: his father was shot in 1938 and mother sent to a Gulag camp. During World War II, he was recruited into the Red Army, but was soon sacked due to his family background. Subsequently, he became involved in anti-Soviet activities, being a member of the underground political organization Tetri Giorgi. In April 1944, he was arrested on coup plot charges and sentenced to twenty-five years of imprisonment in Siberia. After fifteen years in prison, three prison escapes, and two death sentences, he was ultimately rehabilitated in 1959 and began his literary career in his late thirties with short stories including The Road (გზა, 1962), My Ragger Uncle (ჩემი მეჯღანე ბიძა, 1963), The Bull’s Confession (ხარის აღსარება, 1964) and Giorgi Burduli (გიორგი ბურდული, 1965).

Fame 

Amirejibi's most famous novel and one of the best works in modern Georgian literature, Data Tutashkhia (დათა თუთაშხია, 1971-5), achieved sensational success for the magazine Tsiskari and fame for the writer himself. Conceived while in Amirejibi’s years in prison, it was only through the intervention of the contemporary Georgian Communist Party chief Eduard Shevardnadze that this substantial novel of over 700 pages, passed the Soviet censors and got published. The novel is a story of a Georgian outlaw of the Imperial Russian period, a very popular theme in Georgian literature, and combines thrilling escapades with Dostoevskian dealings with the fate of an individual and national soul. The story is narrated by a Russian gendarme, Count Szeged, who frequently passes the story-telling on to other characters. The novel follows the life of outlaw Data Tutashkhia, who spends years eluding capture by the Tsarist police. They are led by Data's cousin, his detached and imperturbable double, Mushni Zarandia. The book, and the feature film based on it, turned Data Tutaskhia into an iconic hero, widely popular in Georgia.

Later career 
Amirejibi hailed the newly independent Georgia, and was elected to its Parliament from 1992 to 1995. In 1992, he was rewarded with the prestigious Shota Rustaveli State Prize. However, the tragic years of civil war and the death of his eldest son Irakli in the War in Abkhazia in 1992 heavily affected the writer. Therefore, it came to a real surprise when Amirejibi published, in 1995, his next major novel, Gora Mborgali (გორა მბორგალი, literally meaning "frenzied" or "infuriating"), begun in 1978, and based on the author’s experiences in Soviet prisons. His most recent work, George the Brilliant (გიორგი ბრწყინვალე), a historical novel about the 14th-century Georgian king preaching national pride, appeared in 2005. 
 
Amirejibi has been decorated with the highest civil orders of Georgia and several Russian and international literary awards.

Amirejibi briefly returned to politics in July 2009, when he joined the movement daitsavi sakartvelo ("Defend Georgia"), allied with the opposition to President Mikheil Saakashvili's government. On November 16, 2010, he was consecrated as a Georgian Orthodox monk under the name of David. Due to his health condition, the ceremony was conducted at the writer's own apartment.

Bibliography 

 The Road (collected stories)  1962
 My Ragger Uncle (collected stories)  1963
 The Bull’s Confession (collected stories)  1964
 Giorgi Burduli (Novel)  1965
 Data Tutashkhia (novel)  1973-1975
 Gora Mborgali (Novel)  1984-1994
 George the Brilliant (Novel)  2003

References

External links 

Chabua Amirejibi's website
Chabua Amirejibi's biography and photogallery. The National Parliamentary Library of Georgia website.

1921 births
2013 deaths
Burials at Mtatsminda Pantheon
Members of the Parliament of Georgia
Writers from Tbilisi
Dissidents from Georgia (country)
Soviet rehabilitations
Prisoners from Georgia (country) sentenced to death
Prisoners sentenced to death by the Soviet Union
Escapees from Soviet detention
Soviet escapees
People from Georgia (country) who escaped
Christian monks from Georgia (country)
Soviet dissidents
Rustaveli Prize winners
Eastern Orthodox monks
Participants in the Norilsk uprising
Soviet writers